Radek Zavadil (born 16 March 1973) is a Czech rower. He competed in the men's eight event at the 1992 Summer Olympics. His sister Lenka Zavadilová is also an Olympic rower.

References

External links
 

1973 births
Living people
Czech male rowers
Olympic rowers of Czechoslovakia
Rowers at the 1992 Summer Olympics
Rowers from Prague